William Randall-Hurren (born 2 May 1997) is an English professional footballer who plays as a midfielder for  club Sutton United.

Playing career

Swindon Town
Randall became a scholar at Swindon Town in the summer of 2013. Will Randall made his professional football debut on the final day of the 2013–14 season as a second-half substitute against Rotherham United.

Wolverhampton Wanderers
On 12 January 2016 he moved to Championship team Wolverhampton Wanderers for a disclosed fee in an 18-month deal.

On 31 January 2017, he signed for League One side Walsall on loan until the end of the season. He made two appearances for the club in all competitions, both as a substitute.

Randall signed a New deal with Wolves 29 August 2017 and on the same day he joined League Two newcomers Forest Green Rovers on loan until the end of the season. He was recalled from his loan spell on 1 January 2018 after making 8 appearances in all competitions for the club. Randall was released by Wolves on 15 January 2019.

Newport County
On 9 March 2019, Randall signed for Newport County until the end of the 2018–19 season. He made his debut for Newport the same day as a second-half substitute in the 3-0 League Two defeat to Colchester United. He was released by Newport at the end of the 2018–19 season.

Sutton United
On 17 July 2019, Randall signed for National League side Sutton United.

Career statistics

Honours

Club
Sutton United
 National League: 2020–21
EFL Trophy runner-up: 2021–22

References

External links

1997 births
Living people
English footballers
Association football midfielders
Swindon Town F.C. players
Wolverhampton Wanderers F.C. players
Walsall F.C. players
FC Jumilla players
Forest Green Rovers F.C. players
Newport County A.F.C. players
Sutton United F.C. players
English Football League players
Segunda División B players
National League (English football) players